Karl Sven Joakim Haeggman (born 28 August 1969) is a Swedish professional golfer who formerly played on the European Tour. He was the first Swede to play in the Ryder Cup.

Early life
Haeggman was born in Kalmar on the east coast of the province of Småland in Sweden. He grew up close to the golf course at Kalmar Golf Club and learned the game without golf playing parents.

He won the unofficial 1985 Swedish Youth Championship, Colgate Cup, at his age level (16 years old)

Amateur career

In 1986, Haeggman won the Swedish Junior Under 19 Championship.

As a 19 year old, Haeggman won the 1988 French Open Amateur Stroke-play Championship at Chantilly, north of Paris, shooting a score of level par 288. The year after, he won the French Junior Open Match-play Championship as well.

He turned professional during 1989, still a junior, why he never represented Sweden on the highest amateur level, only at boys' level and the Continent of Europe at the Jacques Léglise Trophy.

Professional career
He won his place on the European Tour at  the 1989 qualifying school. He has won three events on the European Tour, and several other professional events. His best seasons were 1993, 1997 and 2004, in each of which he made the top twenty on the Order of Merit.

Haeggman won his first tournament on the highest level at the 1993 Peugeot Spanish Open, becoming the first Swedish winner of the event and claiming the tenth Swedish victory on the European Tour.

The same year, Haeggman became the first Swede to play for the European Team in the Ryder Cup. He won his Sunday singles match against John Cook with one hole up, but Europe lost the Ryder Cup match against United States 15-13 at The Belfry Golf Club, England.

Haeggman was out of the game for nearly two years following an ice hockey accident in 1994 which left him with a dislocated shoulder and broken ribs, which deprived him of the chance to play in the following Ryder Cup, and he has not represented Europe again. He also missed half a season after breaking his ankle playing ice hockey in December 2002.

Haeggman represented Sweden four times at the World Cup and twice at the Dunhill Cup.

At the 1993 Dunhill Cup at the Old Course, St Andrews, Scotland, the Swedish team of Haeggman, Anders Forsbrand and Jesper Parnevik finished tied 3rd, after losing just one match, against winners to be United States in the semi finals.

At the 1997 Dunhill Cup, Haeggman scored a record 27 strokes on the front nine holes at the Old Course, in his stroke-play match against Justin Leonard, United States. The Swedish team of Haeggman, Per-Ulrik Johansson and Jesper Parnevik eventually lost in the final of the tournament against South Africa.

Haeggman and Jesper Parnevik represented Sweden at the 1994 World Cup of Golf at the Hyatt Dorado Beach Resort in Puerto Rico.  Sweden finished 3rd, behind United States and Zimbabwe and Haeggman 9th in the individual competition.

Week 30 in July 2004, Haeggman was ranked a career best 39th in the Official World Golf Ranking.

Amateur wins
1988 French Open Amateur Stroke-play Championship
1989 French Junior Open Match-play Championship

Professional wins (10)

European Tour wins (3)

European Tour playoff record (0–1)

Challenge Tour wins (3)

Asia Golf Circuit wins (1)

Argentine Tour wins (1)
1998 Center Open

Other wins (1)
2001 Hassan II Golf Trophy

European Senior Tour wins (1)

Results in major championships

CUT = missed the half-way cut
"T" = tied

Results in World Golf Championships

QF, R16, R32, R64 = Round in which player lost in match play
"T" = Tied
WD = withdrew

Results in senior major championships

CUT = missed the halfway cut
"T" indicates a tie for a place

Team appearances
Amateur
European Boys' Team Championship (representing Sweden): 1986, 1987
Jacques Léglise Trophy (representing the Continent of Europe): 1986 (winners), 1987

Professional
Dunhill Cup (representing Sweden): 1993, 1997
Ryder Cup (representing Europe): 1993
World Cup (representing Sweden): 1993, 1994, 1997, 2004

See also
2008 European Tour Qualifying School graduates
2010 European Tour Qualifying School graduates

References

External links

Swedish male golfers
European Tour golfers
Ryder Cup competitors for Europe
Sportspeople from Kalmar County
People from Kalmar
1969 births
Living people
20th-century Swedish people
21st-century Swedish people